Eicomorpha is a genus of moths of the family Noctuidae.

Species
 Eicomorpha antiqua Staudinger, 1888
 Eicomorpha epipsiloides Bousin, 1970
 Eicomorpha firyuza Ronkay, Varga & Hreblay, 1998
 Eicomorpha koeppeni Alphéraky, 1893
 Eicomorpha kurdistana de Freina & Hacker, 1985

References
Natural History Museum Lepidoptera genus database
Eicomorpha at funet

Noctuinae